The Taichung Football Association (TCFA) is the governing body of football in Taichung City, Republic of China (Taiwan).

History
October 1, 2006: Established.

Competitions 
 Taichung World Youth Football Festival
 Central Taiwan Futsal Championship

See also
 Chinese Taipei Football Association

References

External links
  Official website

2006 establishments in Taiwan
Regional football associations in Taiwan